Umbai is a mukim and town in Jasin District in the Malaysian state of Malacca.

Tourist attractions
 Sultan Ali of Johor Mausoleum
 Umbai Floating Ikan Bakar Village

Transportation
 Anjung Batu Jetty – Jetty for ferries to Besar Island.

See also
 List of cities and towns in Malaysia by population

References

Jasin District
Mukims of Malacca